Calamosternus granarius is a species of dung beetle found with a widespread distribution.

This species was formerly a member of the genus Aphodius.

Description
This is a black shiny beetle with an average length is about 4 to 6 mm. Male and female show slight sexual dimorphisms, where the males have broad pronotum, and smooth clypeus. Females have narrow pronotum and rugose clypeus. Elytral intervals are very finely punctuate. Body convex and short. Pronotum with deep punctures.

References 

Scarabaeidae
Insects of Sri Lanka
Insects described in 1762